"Sound of Your Heart" is a song recorded by Canadian singer-songwriter Shawn Hook for his third studio album, Analog Love (2015). It was released through Kreative Soul Entertainment under license to Universal Music Canada on February 17, 2015, as the album's second single. Reaching the top 25 on the Canadian Hot 100 and being certified Platinum by Music Canada, it is Hook's most successful single to date. The song was re-released internationally in early 2016 through Hollywood Records following Hook signing to the label and has since entered the Billboard Mainstream Top 40 chart and reached the top of the magazine's Dance Club Songs chart.

Composition
"Sound of Your Heart" is a pop and pop rock song written by Todd Clark, Shawn Hook, and Stephen Kozmeniuk about the pain of missing someone you love. It is described by many as very similar to the tune of "La La La", a 2013 song released by Naughty Boy. The song's sound has been described as "dark" and "lush". Hook plays the piano on the track. According to the sheet music published at Musicnotes.com through EMI Music Publishing, the song is composed in the key of F minor and set in common time to a "moderately fast" tempo of approximately 122 BPM. The vocals span two octaves from C through C.

Commercial performance
"Sound of Your Heart" entered the Billboard Canadian Hot 100 at number 100 on the chart dated April 11, 2015. It reached a peak position of 23 on the chart dated June 6, 2015. The song reached number 11 on the Canadian all-genre iTunes chart in May 2015 and peaked at number 12 on the Hot Canadian Digital Songs component chart in June 2015.  On the US Dance Club Songs chart, "Sound of Your Heart" went to number one.

Track listings
Digital download – single
 "Sound of Your Heart" - 3:20

Remixes – EP
 "Sound of Your Heart" (Dave Aude Remix) - 5:35
 "Sound of Your Heart" (DJ Boris Remix) - 7:03
 "Sound of Your Heart" (Jump Smokers Remix) - 3:26
 "Sound of Your Heart" (Mike D Remix) - 3:13

Music video
The accompanying music video was directed by Alon Isocianu and premiered March 23, 2015.

Charts and certifications

Weekly charts

Year-end charts

Certifications

Release history

See also
 List of number-one dance singles of 2016 (U.S.)

References

2015 songs
2015 singles
Hollywood Records singles
Songs written by Stephen Kozmeniuk
Songs written by Todd Clark